Chibesa Kankasa, often known as Mama Kankasa (1936-2018) was a Zambian freedom fighter and politician.

Life
Chibesa Kankasa was born on 23 March 1936 at Lubwa Mission in Chinsali. She was the sixth child of Yotam Chibesakunda, a carpenter, and Chilufya Mununga Mutale Chibwe.In 1941 her parents moved to Chalimbana, and later to Kitwe. She attended Mingolo Girls Boarding School, and later studied to become a social worker, specialising in matrimonial and juvenile delinquency cases. She worked as a social worker from 1951 to 1961.

She married Timothy Kansasa in 1952. As she later recalled:

Kansasa became chairperson of the Women's League within the United National Independence Party (UNIP). In 1972 she was appointed to the Central Committee of UNIP. She was the first woman to be a member of the Central Committee.

Active in working for women's rights, she has been credited by her contemporary Betty Chilunga for the introduction of paid maternity leave to working mothers, and for pushing the Zambian government to begin commemorating International Women's Day.

Kansasa was the first Zambian High Commissioner to Kenya. She was in that post in 1991, when UNIP was ousted from power. She was recalled six months later, and retired from active politics.

In 2002 Kankasa was awarded the Order of the Eagle of Zambia, Second Division. She died at Avrwyp Hospital in Johannesburg, South Africa on 29 October 2018. President Edgar Lungu awarded her a state funeral, and declared Saturday 3 November a day of national mourning.

References

1936 births
2018 deaths
Zambian politicians
Zambian independence activists
20th-century Zambian women politicians
20th-century Zambian politicians
People from Chinsali District